Luis Delfin Attawalpa Saul Felber (born 9 June 1986) is a British-Peruvian musician.

Born in Winchester, England, to a Peruvian mother and a British father, Felber spent his earliest years in Peru and Chile before moving back to Britain at the age of seven. Felber's father is Jewish. Felber began pursuing a career in music, playing guitar with several different bands at age 17.

Career 
He is one of the founders of the label and club night Young Turks. Felber signed to Luv Luv Luv and performed in a duo called Shuga and was also a member of party band Turbogeist.

Felber used to play with Jamie T and Ben Bones. Felber wrote a song with Mick Jagger that was later featured on the 2016 series, Vinyl, created by Jagger himself, along with Martin Scorsese and Terence Winter.

In 2020, Felber began recording and performing solo under the name Attawalpa (which is his middle name, after the 16th-century Incan ruler Atahualpa). He released the debut EP Spells.

In 2021, the album Patterns was released and features five songs released throughout the pandemic. Each comes with its own video. Lena Dunham directed the video for song "Tucked in Tight" and it was filmed on an iPhone in London and the English countryside.

Dunham and Felber are currently working on a soundtrack for a soon to be released film called Catherine Called Birdy, and are writing a script loosely based on their relationship.

Personal life 
After a mutual friend set them up on a blind date, Felber began dating writer and actress Lena Dunham in January 2021. In September 2021, Felber married Dunham in a Jewish ceremony in England, wearing a custom blue suede suit designed by Emily Bode.

Felber resides in London, England.

References 

1986 births
Musicians from Winchester
Living people
Peruvian musicians
British people of Peruvian descent
British people of Jewish descent